The 2.-class torpedo boat was a designation in the Scandinavian countries for a type of fast steam torpedo boats between 40 tons and 80 tons, in service from the 1880s to after World War I.

Ships in class

Royal Danish Navy
 1882 Torpedobaad Nr. 2
 1882 Torpedobaad Nr. 3
 1882 Torpedobaad Nr. 4
 1882 Torpedobaad Nr. 5
 1884 Torpedobaad Nr. 6
 1884 Torpedobaad Nr. 7
 1886 Torpedobaad Nr. 8
 1886 Torpedobaad Nr. 9
 1888 Torpedobaad Nr. 10
 1888 Torpedobaad Nr. 11
 1889 Torpedobaad Nr. 12
 1894 Torpedobaad Hajen
 1894 Torpedobaad Søulven

Royal Norwegian Navy
 HNoMS Lyn (1882)
 HNoMS Glimt
 HNoMS Blink
 HNoMS Pil
 HNoMS Snar
 HNoMS Orm
 HNoMS Oter
 HNoMS Varg
 HNoMS Raket
 HNoMS Djerv
 HNoMS Kvik
 HNoMS Hvas
 HNoMS Kjaek
 HNoMS Hauk
 HNoMS Falk
 HNoMS Orn
 HNoMS Ravn
 HNoMS Grib
 HNoMS Jo
 HNoMS Skarv
 HNoMS Teist
 HNoMS Kjell (1912)

Royal Swedish Navy
HSwMS Hugin (1884)

References 

Torpedo boat classes